Claire Smith (born 10 April 1963) is a Canadian equestrian. She competed in the team eventing at the 1996 Summer Olympics.

References

External links
 
 
 

1963 births
Living people
Canadian female equestrians
Olympic equestrians of Canada
Equestrians at the 1996 Summer Olympics
Sportspeople from Ottawa